Larry R. Marshall  is an Australian physicist and entrepreneur currently serving as the head of the CSIRO, Australia's national scientific research agency. Marshall was appointed to this position on 15 January 2015, succeeding the organisation's first female chief executive Megan Clark.

Early life and education
Marshall was born in Sydney; he received both his undergraduate and postgraduate education at Macquarie University, where he graduated in 1988 with a PhD in physics.

At Macquarie University, Marshall performed research with J. A. Piper on stimulated Raman scattering. While in the United States his research work was mainly on the development of parametric oscillators, diode laser-pumped solid-state lasers, fiber lasers, and laser stabilization. Marshall was an extremely active scientist publishing over 100 papers mostly over a 6-year period. He led a resurgence in Optical Parametric Oscillators, notably inventing the "eyesafe laser" enabling lasers to be used safely around humans, the single-frequency solid-state blue laser for submarine imaging, the highest efficiency frequency doubled laser, solid state UV289nm laser for detection of tryptophan, nonlinear cavity dumping using OPOs, the intra-intra-cavity OPO for wide IR tunable medical lasers, and the first high power all solid state green laser for ophthalmology.

Following his PhD work, Marshall lived in the United States where he spent time at Stanford University, and founded a total of 6 startups over the course of 26 years. He has also registered 20 US patents, which were the basis for his startups

Career
Before his career at the CSIRO, Marshall previously worked for the Australian a cadet scientist at the Defence Science and Technology Organisation.

Controversy 
Marshall has also been involved with controversy as a result of his time in the private sector, involving allegations against the board of Arasor by a speculative lawsuit launched by a litigation fund International Litigation Partners. In an ongoing claim before the Federal Court, it has been alleged that Marshall, former Arasor executive chairman Simon Cao and other directors produced highly misleading prospectuses and financial reports and falsely claimed the company was on track to make millions of dollars in profit.
International Litigation Partners was itself sued by the Australian Tax Office for tax evasion, and its founder Paul Lindholm charged with resisting arrest.

Climate research cutbacks
Australian and international scientists have criticized Marshall's cutbacks to measurement and modeling of climate change, in order to increase research into mitigation and adaptation. CSIRO announced layoffs of 140 researchers per year over 2 years in the agency's shift to deliver greater national benefit. The cutbacks were incorrectly reported to include the Cape Grim research station in north-western Tasmania, which has measured airborne greenhouse gases since 1976, and Australia's participation in the Argo ocean observation program, which has 3,800 floats about 180 miles apart, which collect data on sea currents, salinity and temperature. However, none of these were ever at risk. A petition by 3,000 scientists from more than 60 countries called the cuts "devastating" and said that research stations like Cape Grim are "critical and irreplaceable" to global climate science, because they will monitor how well other countries are complying with their international agreements. One scientist said that basic research on climate change was particularly important to Australia, which was particularly vulnerable with its desert, wildfires, and drought. CSIRO officials said that the measurements at Cape Grim and Argo would continue, but scientists said that the climate science team would lose 70 to 100 scientists, which would leave them unable to manage and interpret the data that they are collecting. Despite these reports, the actual reductions to the 440 staff of Oceans and Atmosphere group which contains climate science was a total of 65, of which 40 were from climate science. The New York Times headline "Australia turns its back on climate science" was probably the most outrageous, or as Marshall said in Senate hearings, "complete rubbish".

Sydney Morning Herald's environment editor, Peter Hannam, broke the story about CSIRO's proposed cuts to its climate research and capability on 4 February 2016, based on leaks from senior scientists in Climate science. After Hannam's story Marshall rushed to advise staff by email that, CSIRO's climate models "are among the best in the world", and contributed to proving global climate change. In his email, Marshall wrote: "That question has been answered, and the new question is what do we do about it, and how can we find solutions for the climate we will be living with?"  The Director of the ARC Centre of Excellence for Climate System Science, UNSW Australia, Professor Andy Pitman, who successfully secured new government funding in collaboration with CSIRO for the ARC Centre of Excellence for Climate Extremes, described this assertion as "among the most ill-informed statements I have ever heard from a senior executive." Other experts rallied to vigorously challenge the underpinning logic of CSIROs proposed changes prompting Marshall to issue an official statement on 8 February alleging "incorrect reporting by media". In his statement Marshall claimed that CSIRO's plans had been misrepresented and, although Marshall claimed that the CSIRO would retain the ability to support climate measurement in Australia, he nevertheless defended the decision to reduce climate change modeling and measurement to increase mitigation and adaptation: "No one is saying climate change is not important, but surely mitigation, health, education, sustainable industries, and prosperity of the nation are no less important." In defending his decisions, Marshall told the ABC "I guess I had the realisation that the climate lobby is perhaps more powerful than the energy lobby was back in the '70s – and the politics of climate I think there's a lot of emotion in this debate", adding "In fact it almost sounds more like religion than science to me" Marshall later apologized for his reference to religion at the start of a subsequent Senate Estimates hearing.

The CSIRO's proposed cuts to climate research and measurement have been subjected to criticism by the international science community, although not a single global entity has ever criticized CSIRO for this change. The controversy even merited an editorial in the New York Times. In Australia the CSIRO's plans also attracted intense political scrutiny by the Australian Labor Party and the Australian Greens. In addition, major questions have arisen about the adequacy of the governance and due diligence applied by the CEO and senior managers to decision-making around the proposed cuts and adherence to formal processes around consultation with staff and unions. Marshall himself has admitted to a degree of naivety on his part, saying that he had not anticipated "how much politics this job would entail."

On 8 and 9 March 2016, the Senate Select Committee into the Scrutiny of Government Budget Measures convened public hearings in Hobart and in Melbourne for the purpose of "looking at the potential ramifications of proposed cuts to the CSIRO". Chair of the Hobart hearing, Senator Whish-Wilson(Australian Greens) commented at the end of that day's testimony: "I do not think much has been thought through about this decision, to be honest, looking at the weight of evidence that the committee has received." In a subsequent hearing in Melbourne, the former chief of CSIRO Marine and Atmospheric Research, Professor Tony Haymet, offered the following testimony: "The capability of the CSIRO that the executive proposes to cut is vital and is greatly needed for the future of all Australians." He went on to say that: "it seems that there is a complete lack of trust from these executives in their most valuable assets—the people who work for CSIRO". This, he suggested, "is unprecedented". Documents provided by the CSIRO to the Senate Select Committee in response to Questions on Notice from the Hobart hearing appeared to confirm the scale of the proposed cuts to CSIRO's climate change research and monitoring capability.

In a radio interview with Alex Sloan on Canberra's ABC 666 on 9 February 2016, former Liberal Party Leader John Hewson said the government is "cutting down the CSIRO's capacity to monitor climate change" despite the reality that "there's still more to be done". Why, he asked, would you "be sending negative signals while at the same time you're trying to send positive signals about innovation and a sensible response to [climate change]". The "problem", he concluded is that "[Malcolm] Turnbull did a deal with conservatives in the Party to stay with the Abbott climate change policies". This, he said, "doesn't make any sense in a world where we have to accelerate the response to climate change". On 21 March 2016, in an interview with the host of Radio National's Late Night Live, Phillip Adams, former Secretary of the Department of the Prime Minister and Cabinet, Terry Moran AC, said of the CSIRO's intention to cut 350 positions – including those associated with climate change research – "I don't know what the CEO or the Board thought they were doing when they made such a big change like that, you might have to make adjustments over time but to do it just a few months out from an election and totally disrupt lots of good work that's being done by the CSIRO in [climate change] and other fields is odd, odd, very odd. "Silly", as you said."

Speculation on water divining 
In 2014, during an interview with ABC Radio, Marshall publicly speculated upon the merits of water divining:
 "When I see that as a scientist, it makes me question, 'is there instrumentality that we could create that would enable a machine to find that water?"
These claims came only months before his official appointment within the CSIRO, sparking some minor controversy. This led to the pseudoscience investigation group the Australian Skeptics awarding him Bent Spoon award for "the most preposterous piece of paranormal or pseudoscientific piffle".

References

Living people
Australian physicists
Australian chief executives
CSIRO
CSIRO people
Macquarie University alumni
Venture capitalists
Year of birth missing (living people)